Masateru (written: 將晃, 政輝 or 正照) is a masculine Japanese given name. Notable people with the name include:

 (born 1982), Japanese footballer
 (born 1948), Japanese sumo wrestler
 (1945–1995), Japanese sumo wrestler

Japanese masculine given names